A salt evaporation pond is a shallow artificial salt pan designed to extract salts from sea water or other brines.  The Salt pans are shallow and expansive, allowing sunlight to penetrate and reach the seawater. Natural salt pans are formed through geological processes, where water evaporating, leaving behind salts deposits. Some salt evaporation ponds are only slightly modified from their natural version, such as the ponds on Great Inagua in the Bahamas, or the ponds in Jasiira, a few kilometres south of Mogadishu, where seawater is trapped and left to evaporate in the sun.

The seawater or brine is fed into large ponds and water is drawn out through natural evaporation which allows the salt to be subsequently harvested.

The ponds also provide a productive resting and feeding ground for many species of waterbirds, which may include endangered species. The ponds are commonly separated by levees. Salt evaporation ponds may also be called salterns, salt works or salt pans.

Algae and color 

Due to variable algal concentrations, vivid colors (from pale green to bright red) are created in the evaporation ponds. The color indicates the salinity of the ponds. Microorganisms change their hues as the salinity of the pond increases. In low- to mid-salinity ponds, green algae such as Dunaliella salina are predominant, although these algae can also take on an orange hue.  Halobacteria, a type of halophilic Archaea (also known as Haloarchaea), are responsible for changning the color of middle to high-salinity ponds to shades of pink, red, and orange. Other bacteria such as Stichococcus also contribute tints.

Examples 
Notable salt ponds include:

 The Salterns of Guérande, in Loire-Atlantique, France. The salt produced in the salterns are a protected geographical indication in Europe.
 The Cáhuil salt ponds, in the O'Higgins Region, Chile.
 The Salineras de Maras, Peru, in the Cusco Region.
 The saltworks of Alcácer do Sal, Comporta, and Castro Marim in Portugal
 The El Caracol solar evaporator, on the outskirts of Mexico City, Mexico.
 The Sečovlje and Strunjan salt ponds on the northern edge of the Adriatic Sea in Slovenia.
 The San Francisco Bay salt ponds in the United States, formerly operated by Cargill, including Charleston Slough. Cargill has since ended salt production in the area, and most of the ponds are being restored to a more natural state.
 The Dead Sea salt ponds in the West Bank, Israel and Jordan.
 The salt ponds in Salina, Malta. The name of the village is the Maltese word for salt pan.
 The Port Hedland, Dampier, Lake McLeod, Useless Loop and Onslow salt ponds in Western Australia.
 Yellow Walls, Malahide, Ireland; active from 1770 to 1837.
Lake Grassmere in New Zealand
 The ancient salt pans in Marsala and Trapani, Sicily. Salt has been farmed here since the Phoenician period, with archaeological evidence still present in nearby Motya.
 The Nature reserve of Margherita di Savoia, in Apulia, Italy. Known since antiquity, it's one of the largest in Europe. Flamingos often nest in the area.
 The salt works on the island of Great Inagua owned by Morton Salt.
 The salt harvesting by the Tsonga women of Baleni on the Small Letaba River, Limpopo, South Africa.

Until World War II, salt was extracted from sea water in a unique way in Egypt near Alexandria. Posts were set out on the salt pans and covered with several feet of sea water. In time the sea water evaporated, leaving the salt behind on the post, where it was easier to harvest.

Production 

Salt pans are shallow open, often metal, pans used to evaporate brine. They are usually found close to the source of the salt. For example, pans used in the solar evaporation of salt from sea water are usually found on the coast, while those used to extract salt from solution-mined brine will be found near to the brine shaft. In this case, extra heat is often provided by lighting fires underneath.

Gallery

See also 
 Solar desalination
 Seawater greenhouse
 Evaporite

References

External links 

 NASA page on salt ponds
 Information on the San Francisco Bay salt ponds
 Interactive satellite view
 "Salt, Grown On Sticks Harvested From Sea" Popular Science, March 1933

Ponds
Salt production
Economic geology
Primitive technology
Resource extraction